Grilled is a 2006 American dark comedy film directed by Jason Ensler and starring Ray Romano and Kevin James. It was released direct-to-video in the United States on July 11, 2006. Maurice (Romano) and Dave (James) are inept door-to-door meat salesmen who need to make a sale to keep their jobs. After several unsuccessful attempts, they meet a potential client who leads the guys into a complicated series of events culminating with an encounter with a Mafia princess and a deadly mobster.

Plot
Maurice and Dave try, but fail to sell steaks to people through a mail service. Tired of their incompetence, their boss gives them cards with the names and addresses of their highest buyers, warning that this is their last chance. Dave loses all but one of the cards. It leads to a woman named Loridonna.

Loridonna is on the phone with her friend Suzanne, who has swallowed a fish and needs help. Loridonna tells Suzanne that Dave is a doctor and gives him the phone; while Dave is talking to Suzanne, Loridonna talks seductively about wanting Maurice's "meat". Turned on, Maurice tries to seal a deal, but Dave says Suzanne wants to kill herself. They drive Loridonna to Suzanne's house, where they discover that she is an alcoholic whose suicide was a false alarm.

Loridonna and Maurice begin making out, and Suzanne's husband Tony comes home and catches them, but he casually changes clothes while telling Maurice that she was once a man. Suzanne confirms this and tries to explain, but Maurice is too disappointed (and disgusted) to care. Tony then attempts to kill Dave, thinking he tried to seduce Suzanne. After explaining, Dave and Tony become friendly. Tony begins to grill some steaks, then is ambushed, shot, and killed by two hitmen.

Finding some of Tony's guns, Dave and Maurice fight back. The hitmen put them into the trunk of their car and leave them there while attending a party. Maurice manages to get out, then sees Goldbluth, a name from the cards they got from their boss. After freeing Dave, they start describing to party guests the tenderness of their steaks. The hitmen return looking for them. Dave is unable to leave because Goldbluth is rambling on. He signs a contract to buy meat, so they warn Goldbluth that two hitmen are here to kill him. Dave gives Goldbluth the gun Tony had when he was killed.

Maurice and Dave drive off, looking back to see shots fired. Goldbluth comes out without a scratch. Maurice and Dave return to their boss with seven orders and $21,000 up front from Goldbluth.

Cast

Release
Grilled was originally titled Men Don't Quit, and was set for a worldwide theatrical release in 2005. Poor test screenings pushed it back, and the film only received a theatrical release in the United Arab Emirates. The film was released straight-to-video in the United States.

Reception

Box office 
The film only saw a theatrical performance in the United Arab Emirates. In its opening weekend, the film ranked third, grossing $26,012 from 12 theaters with an average of $2,167 per screen. The film dropped to fifth in its sophomore weekend with a decrease of 45.8%, grossing $14,103 from 10 theaters with an average of $1,410 per screen, before being pulled completely from all remaining theaters.

Critical response 
The film received negative reviews from critics. Scott Weinberg of DVDTalk gave the film 2 out of 5 stars, writing, "I suppose there's a great comedy to be made on the subject of door-to-door meat salesmen... actually, there probably isn't".

Home media
On the North American Region 1 DVD, bonus features include a single deleted scene, a making-of featurette, and a documentary on Romano and James' real-life friendship.

References

External links
 Official site
 
 

2006 direct-to-video films
2000s buddy comedy films
2006 black comedy films
2006 LGBT-related films
2006 films
American buddy comedy films
American black comedy films
American LGBT-related films
2006 directorial debut films
2000s English-language films
Films about businesspeople
LGBT-related black comedy films
American gangster films
Transgender-related films
2006 comedy films
Films directed by Jason Ensler
2000s American films